DMC may refer to:

Computer science and information technology

 Diffusion Monte Carlo method
 Dynamic Markov Compression algorithm
 Digital Media Controller, a category within the DLNA standard
 Data Matrix Code, laser etched square code, often used for marking products in the production area
 Discrete memoryless channel

Media and entertainment

 Digital mixing console
 Darryl McDaniels, a member of hip hop group Run–DMC
 Devil May Cry, a Japanese video game series
 Devil May Cry (video game), the first game in the series
 DmC: Devil May Cry, a reboot of the series
 Detroit Metal City, a manga franchise
 Disco Mix Club, a remix label
 Dhammakaya Media Channel, a Thai television channel
 Deathmatch Classic, a Half-Life mod
 Drummond Money-Coutts, an English magician
 DMC (Egyptian TV channel), an Arabic-language channel

Motor vehicles
 DeLorean Motor Company
 DeLorean Motor Company (Texas)
 Daelim Motor Company, South Korea

Organizations
 Damak Multiple Campus, Jhapa, Nepal
 Dhaka Medical College, Bangladesh
 Diabetes Management Center, Services Hospital Lahore
 Divisional Model College in Pakistan
 Deseret Management Corporation, LDS Church company
 Destination management company, organizing events
 Detroit Medical Center, Michigan, US
 Dipolog Medical Centre Foundation College, Inc, Dipolog City, Philippines
 Data monitoring committee for a clinical trial

Other uses
 Detailed marks certificate, a detailed report of academic performance
 Digital Media City, Seoul, South Korea
 Disaster Monitoring Constellation of imaging satellites
 DMC International Imaging, operator of satellites
 Dimethyl carbonate, a chemical compound
 Dissimilar metal corrosion
 Domestic material consumption, measurement of material used
 Double monocable, a type of ropeway technology
 Dubai Maritime City
 DMC (Company) (Dollfus-Mieg et Compagnie) a textile company in Mulhouse, France
 2-Chloro-1,3-dimethylimidazolinium chloride (CAS Number 37091-73-9) a chemical reagent, similar to 1-Ethyl-3-methylimidazolium chloride for coupling reactions 
  4,4’-dimethoxychalcone